The House Committee was a select committee of the House of Lords in the Parliament of the United Kingdom that set policy and provided guidance for long-term planning for the House, supervised its finances, and supervised the scheme for members' expenses.

It was replaced with the House of Lords Commission in August 2016.

See also
List of Committees of the United Kingdom Parliament

External links
House Committee − UK Parliament

Committees of the House of Lords